Ehsan Pirhadi is an Iranian football striker, who currently plays for Azadegan League side Shahrdari Tabriz.

Club career
He made his debut during 2010–11 season, played his first match against Mes Kerman.

Club career statistics

 Assist Goals

Honours

Club
Esteghlal
Iran Pro League (1): 2012–13
Runner up (1): 2010–11

External links
 Ehsan Pirhadi at Persian League

Iranian footballers
Living people
Esteghlal F.C. players
1991 births
Association football midfielders